The Politburo of the 28th Congress of the Communist Party of the Soviet Union was in session from 1990 to 1991.

The new politburo was expunged and weakened, and apart from Mikhail Gorbachev himself, no members also held positions in the state or government leadership of the Soviet Union. Included in the new politburo were all the republic party heads. The resulting geographical diversity made the past practice of weekly meetings impractical. In addition, the category of nonvoting candidate members was dropped.

Composition

References

External links
 Politburo of the Communist Party of the Soviet Union (Узкий состав ЦК РСДРП(б) - Политическое бюро ЦК РСДРП(б) - Бюро ЦК РСДРП(б) - РКП(б) - Политическое бюро ЦК РКП(б) - ВКП(б) - Президиум - Политическое бюро ЦК КПСС). Handbook on history of the Communist Party and the Soviet Union 1898–1991.

Politburo of the Central Committee of the Communist Party of the Soviet Union members
1990 in the Soviet Union
1991 in the Soviet Union
1990 establishments in the Soviet Union
1991 disestablishments in the Soviet Union